In Australia, Herne Hill may refer to:
Herne Hill, Victoria, a residential suburb of Geelong
Herne Hill, Western Australia, a suburb of Perth